Constituency NA-144 may refer to:

 NA-144 (Okara-IV), a present constituency (after 2018 delimitation) that covers the entire Depalpur rural areas
 NA-144 (Okara-II), a former constituency based on 2002 delimitation that covered Okara City, Okara Cantonment and adjoining villages

National Assembly Constituencies of Pakistan